The 1970 Dutch Open was a combined men's and women's tennis tournament staged in Hilversum, Netherlands. The tournament was played on outdoor clay courts and was held from 3 August until 9 August 1970. It was the 14th edition of the tournament. Tom Okker won the men's singles title and earned $3,000 first-prize money while Margaret Court won the women's singles event.

Finals

Men's singles
 Tom Okker defeated  Roger Taylor 4–6, 6–0, 6–1, 6–3

Women's singles
 Margaret Court defeated  Kerry Melville 6–1, 6–1

Men's doubles
 Bill Bowrey /  Owen Davidson defeated  John Alexander /  Phil Dent 6–3, 6–4, 6–2

Women's doubles
 Karen Krantzcke /  Kerry Melville defeated  Margaret Court /  Helga Niessen 3–6, 9–7, 7–5

Mixed doubles
 Winnie Shaw /  Owen Davidson defeated  Christina Sandberg /  Bob Maud 4–6, 6–3, 7–5

References

Dutch Open (tennis)
Dutch Open
Dutch Open
Dutch Open (tennis), 1970